Charles John Crowle (1738 - 1811) was a British politician.

Crowle was the Member of Parliament for Richmond, Yorkshire in the House of Commons of Great Britain, between 1769 and 1774. He subsequently represented Harristown in the Irish House of Commons from 1781 to 1783.

References

1738 births
1811 deaths
British MPs 1768–1774
Irish MPs 1776–1783
Members of the Parliament of Great Britain for English constituencies
Members of the Parliament of Ireland (pre-1801) for County Kildare constituencies